Al Ahly Tennis Table Club (often referred to as) is one of Al Ahly SC club's sections that represent the club in Egypt and international Table tennis competitions, the club team section based in Cairo.

History 

- Table tennis was first played in AlAhly in 1939. Al Ahly is the biggest team in Egypt, Africa, and the Middle east.

- The players of first-team names were: Farouk Yousef, Nabih Eskander, Samir Beltagy, and Mokhtar Abdelhamid.

- The team manager was Amin Abu Haif.

- The first two championships that the Al Ahly table tennis team won was the Cairo Zone Championship and the El Ebrashy Beek Cup

Honors

National titles

 Egyptian Table Tennis League 33 (Record):

 Champions : 1979-80, 1980-81, 1981-82, 1982-83, 1983-84, 1984-85, 1985-86, 1988-89, 1990-91 1991-92, 1992-93, 1993-94, 1995-96, 1996-97, 1997-98, 1998-99, 2002-03, 2003-04, 2006-07,  2007-08, 2009-10, 2010-11, 2011-12, 2012-13, 2013-14, 2014-15, 2015-16, 2016-17, 2017-18., 2018-19, 2019-20, 2020-21, 2021-22.
 Egyptian Table tennis Cup: (5) Record
 Champions : 1991-92, 2002-03, 2003-04, 2016-17, 2018-19

International titles

 African Table tennis Champions League (3) :
 Champions :  1983, 2015, 2017

 Runners-up : 2011

Regional titles
 Arab table tennis championship 21 (Record):

 Champions :  1990, 1992, 1993, 1994, 1995, 1996, 1997, 1998, 1999, 2002, 2003, 2004, 2007, 2009, 2010, 2013, 2014, 2016, 2018, 2019, 2021

 Runners-up (5): 1991, 2008, 2011, 2012, 2015.

Al Ahly Table tennis Squad

Men's current squad

Women's current squad

Technical and managerial staff

Notable players 

 01-  Alaa Meshref
 02-  Sherief ElSaket
 03-  Ashraf Sobhey
 04-  Sherif Diaa
 05-  El Sayed Lashin
 06-  Omar Asser
 07-  Adel Massaad
 08-  Ahmed Noussir
 09-  Ashraf Abdel Fatah
 10-  Adel Shoman 
 11-  Samy Saaeed
 12-  Mohamed El Sharqwey
 13-  Galal Eiz
 14-  Fathey Abdou
 15-  Sayed Metwaley

Home Arena 
When Al Ahly created handball, basketball, and volleyball teams, they believed it was incumbent upon them to erect an arena to host the home games. In 1978, they were low on funding. Because of this, the project was postponed. Later, on February 4, 1994, Al Ahly opened his sports hall officially in time of Al Ahly Chairman Saleh Selim

Opening Ceremony
After many years of waiting, Al Ahly finally achieved his dream of having his very own sports hall arena. On February 4, 1994, Al Ahly officially opened his arena in grand fashion. The ceremony started with words from then-incumbent Al Ahly chairman, Saleh Selim. With this speech, he declared that the name of the hall would be the "Prince Abdalla El Faisl Hall" because of the role he played in creating Al Ahly.

Club Presidents

See also
 Al Ahly FC
 Al Ahly (volleyball)
 Al Ahly Women's Volleyball
 Al Ahly (basketball)
 Al Ahly Women's Basketball
 Al Ahly (handball)
 Al Ahly Women's Handball
 Al Ahly (table tennis)
 Al Ahly (water polo)
 Port Said Stadium riot
 Al-Ahly TV

References

External links

V
Table tennis clubs
1955 establishments in Egypt
Sports clubs established in 1955